James Phillip Fleming (born March 12, 1943) is a former United States Air Force pilot who served in the Vietnam War. Born in Sedalia, Missouri, he was awarded the Medal of Honor for rescuing a six-man MACV-SOG reconnaissance team, stranded between heavily defended enemy positions, near Đức Cơ, Vietnam in 1968.

Early life
Born in March 12, 1943 in Sedalia, Missouri, Fleming entered military service at Pullman, Washington.

Military career
In 1968, Fleming was an aircraft commander of a UH-1F transport helicopter assigned to the 20th Special Operations Squadron at Ban Me Thuot East Airfield in the Republic of Vietnam. Hours later, they found themselves penned up next to a river, with enemy forces on the three remaining sides. The team leader's call for immediate evacuation was received by an Air Force forward air controller (FAC), Major Charles E. Anonsen, as well as Fleming's nearby flight of five UH-1s. All five helicopters, despite being low on fuel, headed toward the coordinates while the FAC briefed them on the situation.

The Green Berets were taking heavy fire from six heavy machine guns and an undetermined number of enemy troops. As soon as the helicopters sighted the team's smoke, the gunships opened fire, knocking out two machine gun positions. One gunship was hit and crash-landed across the river, its crew picked up by another of the transports. A second transport, low on fuel, had to pull out of formation and return to base. There were only two helicopters left, Fleming's and one other that was almost out of ammunition.

Hovering just above the jungle treetops, Fleming inspected the only clearing near enough for the troops to reach and found it impossible to land there. He instead flew over the river and hovered just above the water, with his landing skids against the bank, hoping that the special forces troops would be able to run the few yards to his helicopter safely. In addition to exposing his aircraft to ground fire, this maneuver was a balancing act that required great piloting skill. After waiting for several minutes, the reconnaissance team radioed that they could not survive a dash to the helicopter. Fleming lifted his UH-1 out of range of the hostile fire.

The FAC directed the Green Berets to detonate their mines as Fleming made a last attempt to rescue them. As the mines exploded, he again lowered his helicopter to the river bank, balancing against it, giving the Green Berets an open cargo door through which to leap to safety. The enemy soldiers concentrated their fire on the UH-1. The Green Berets ran for the chopper, firing as they ran and killing three Viet Cong barely  from the aircraft. As they leaped through the cargo door, Fleming once more backed the helicopter away from the bank and flew down the river to safety.

In a ceremony at the White House on May 14, 1970, President Richard Nixon presented the Medal of Honor to Fleming for his actions during the rescue. Fleming's other decorations include the Silver Star, the Distinguished Flying Cross and eight Air Medals.

Fleming remained in the air force, becoming a colonel and a member of the Officer Training School staff at Lackland Air Force Base, Texas, before his retirement in 1996.

Awards and decorations
Fleming's decorations include:

Medal of Honor citation

Fleming's official Medal of Honor citation reads:

See also

List of Medal of Honor recipients for the Vietnam War

References

External links

Air Force pilot rescues Special Forces team – 11/26/1968

1943 births
Living people
People from Sedalia, Missouri
Military personnel from Missouri
United States Air Force colonels
Aviators from Missouri
United States Air Force personnel of the Vietnam War
United States Air Force Medal of Honor recipients
Recipients of the Silver Star
Recipients of the Distinguished Flying Cross (United States)
Recipients of the Air Medal
Recipients of the Gallantry Cross (Vietnam)
Vietnam War recipients of the Medal of Honor
People from Longview, Washington